Calycorectes is a genus of plant in family Myrtaceae first described as a genus in 1856. It is native to South America, southern Mexico, and the Dominican Republic.

Accepted species

Formerly included
moved to other genera: Eugenia Hottea Plinia Psidium Siphoneugena Stereocaryum

References

 
Myrtaceae genera
Taxonomy articles created by Polbot